Burgruine Steinschloß is a castle in Styria, Austria. It is the highest castle ruin in Styria at 1180 meters above sea level.

See also
List of castles in Austria

References
This article was initially translated from the German Wikipedia.

Castles in Styria